is a Japanese guitarist, lyricist, music arranger, and musical artist from Kumamoto Prefecture. He is signed to Columbia Music Entertainment, for which he is known for writing and performing various anime and tokusatsu theme songs. He is known for his solo performance of the theme song of Mahou Sentai Magiranger and for performing guitar for the Dragon Ball Kai theme songs "Dragon Soul" and "Yeah! Break! Care! Break!", which he also composed as one-half of a special unit, Dragon Soul. He is part of Columbia's Project.R group for Super Sentai theme songs.

References

External links
Official website
Official blog

1976 births
Japanese male composers
Japanese composers
Japanese guitarists
Japanese music arrangers
Japanese male pop singers
Living people
People from Kumamoto Prefecture
Musicians from Kumamoto Prefecture
Anime musicians
21st-century Japanese singers
21st-century Japanese guitarists
21st-century Japanese male singers